The Chinese Palace, also known as Real Casina alla Cinese, is a former royal residence of the House of Bourbon-Two Sicilies designed in the style of Chinoiserie. It is located in Palermo, inside the park of La Favorita. The Ethnographic Museum of Sicily, named after Giuseppe Pitrè, is located in one of the Palace's guesthouse.

History 
The building was designed in 1799 by the architect Giuseppe Venanzio Marvuglia on commission by the King Ferdinand III of Sicily. The ruler had previously bought land and a house that was Chinese in design, belonging to the Baron Benedetto Lombardo and designed by Marvuglia himself. The architectural complex and its garden were completed between 1800 and 1806.

In 1860, as a result of the Unification of Italy, the residence passed to the House of Savoy. Then, it became the property of the Comune of Palermo and has been converted into a museum.

Description 
The apartments of the Palace are distributed on three floors. On the first floor there are the reception hall, a dining room and the bedroom of the King. On the second floor there is the apartment of the Queen Maria Carolina of Austria. On the third floor there's an octagonal terrace covered like a pagoda.

The building is decorated with paintings and frescoes of Giuseppe Velazquez, Vincenzo Riolo and other artists.

Gallery

See also 

 Parco della Favorita
 Riserva naturale orientata Monte Pellegrino
 Museo Etnografico Siciliano Giuseppe Pitrè

References

External links 
  Image gallery
  History of the palace - Provincia Regionale di Palermo

Cinese
Royal residences in the Kingdom of Sicily
Eclectic architecture
Chinoiserie